Anne Louise Wyllie (born 1985) is a New Zealand microbiologist who was the lead author of a 2020 research article which led to the development of the SalivaDirect PCR method of testing saliva for SARS-CoV-2, the virus that causes COVID-19. She has also worked on community studies to better understand pneumococcal disease. She is a research scientist in epidemiology with the Public Health Modeling Unit at Yale University.

Early life and education 
Wyllie studied at Northcote College in Auckland. She completed a BSc in Biomedical Science at the University of Auckland in 2007, followed by a Postgraduate Diploma, and Masters in Medical Science in 2009 at the Auckland Cancer Society Research Centre (University of Auckland), with a dissertation entitled In vitro studies of the anti-tumour agent DMXAA. Wyllie completed a PhD in medical microbiology in 2016 at Utrecht University, with a dissertation entitled Molecular surveillance of pneumococcal carriage in all ages. Since early 2020, she has worked as a research scientist in the Department of Epidemiology of Microbial Diseases at the Yale School of Public Health at Yale University.

Saliva testing research 
Wyllie began working on the use of saliva as a sample source to improve the detection of the pneumococcus bacteria in community settings in 2011.

In early 2020, at the start of the COVID-19 pandemic, Wyllie joined the Yale IMPACT Covid responses where they encountered a collapse of the supply chain for nasopharyngeal swabs, as well as hesitancy by both patients and healthcare staff to perform swabbing. This prompted her to advocate the validation of saliva testing for SARS-CoV-2. Wyllie wanted to develop a saliva test for SARS-CoV-2 but was hampered by a lack of funding.

By April 2020, Wyllie and her colleagues had demonstrated that saliva could be a sensitive and reliable sample for SARS-CoV-2 detection. Wyllie and her team compared side-by-side samples of "gold standard" nasopharyngeal swabs and saliva samples. They discovered that saliva samples could be just as reliable. They also found asymptomatic individuals were testing positive in saliva samples several days before the nasopharyngeal swabs would be positive; however, Wyllie wanted to further develop saliva as a sample type to enable frequent, repeat testing and to drive down testing costs to make testing more accessible. During the spring of 2020, Wyllie and others in Nathan Grubaugh's lab developed a test called SalivaDirect, described as simpler, cheaper, and less invasive than nasopharyngeal testing. The SalivaDirect test collects saliva in a tube without requiring a swab and thus does not require collection by healthcare workers. It also does not involve RNA extraction, allowing direct PCR testing of samples, and cutting the time required to process samples as well as the expense of testing. Removing the RNA extraction from the process also allows a wider range of laboratories to engage in saliva testing than nasopharyngeal testing.

In April 2020, Wyllie, as lead author, submitted a paper to The New England Journal of Medicine describing the team's research; it was published in August 2020.

This work sparked interest from the NBA which was keen to pursue saliva-testing as a means to run a season more safely. Funding from the NBA supported the development, validation, and optimization of SalivaDirect while providing a test population to validate the test for use in asymptomatic people. The SalivaDirect test received FDA emergency use authorization in August 2020, allowing for its nationwide rollout. Through the Fast Grant, part of the Emergent Ventures scheme set up by economist Tyler Cowen, she was able to raise an additional $500,000 to support the further development of the test and to support local testing efforts. For her efforts, Wyllie was dubbed the "Spit Queen" in an interview on NPR.

In August 2021, Wyllie wrote to New Zealand prime minister Jacinda Ardern to express her concerns over the slow rollout of saliva testing in New Zealand, when other countries had been saliva-testing widely for over a year. She was also critical of the method used to validate the saliva test conducted by Asia Pacific Healthcare Group (APHG) in New Zealand, saying that APHG was using methods that were not widely used overseas. In September 2021, Wyllie said in an interview on Radio New Zealand that the New Zealand government had been "badly advised" with respect to saliva testing. In response, Anoop Singh, the chief executive of APHG, questioned Wyllie's qualifications and the relevance of her research, and claimed that saliva samples could be tested in the same way as nasopharyngeal swabs (i.e. with RNA extraction). Singh was reported as saying, "Sorry who is Anne Wyllie? Who is Anne Wyllie? She's a research scientist sitting in the US on some university campus. How is she qualified?" Singh's comments led to a social media backlash, including the creation of Wyllie's English Wikipedia page.

APHG was contracted by the New Zealand Ministry of Health to deliver saliva testing beginning in May 2021, but the programme did not begin until August. Singh blamed the delay between contracting and roll-out on the Ministry of Health.

Wyllie represented the Yale School of Public Health at the September 2021 Global COVID-⁠19 Summit hosted by president Joe Biden.

Honours and awards 
Wyllie received a Medal of Excellence from the Northcote College Board of Trustees in 2020. She also received the COVID-19 Research Award from the Yale School of Public Health in 2021.

Selected publications

References

External links 

 
 

Living people
New Zealand epidemiologists
New Zealand virologists
People educated at Northcote College
University of Auckland alumni
Utrecht University alumni
Yale University faculty
1985 births
21st-century New Zealand scientists
21st-century women scientists
21st-century biologists
New Zealand microbiologists
Women epidemiologists